Ross Davidson (born 28 October 1993) is a Scottish footballer, who plays for Scottish League Two side Stirling Albion as a midfielder.

Career
Davidson made his senior competitive debut on 3 December 2011 as a substitute for Garry Hay in a 2–0 victory against Aberdeen in a Scottish Premier League fixture. Davidson was loaned to First Division club Airdrie United in January 2013. After missing the 2013–14 season through injury, in November 2014, he joined League Two club Albion Rovers on loan until January 2015.

In February 2015 having been released by Kilmarnock, Davidson signed permanently for Scottish League One side Albion Rovers.

In May 2022, after four seasons with East Fife, Davidson joined Scottish League Two side Stirling Albion.

Career statistics
.

References

External links

1993 births
Living people
Scottish footballers
Scottish Premier League players
Scottish Football League players
Scottish Professional Football League players
Kilmarnock F.C. players
Association football forwards
Airdrieonians F.C. players
Albion Rovers F.C. players
East Fife F.C. players
Stirling Albion F.C. players